Douglas Lane Patey (born 1952) is an American academic and professor of English at Smith College in Northampton, Massachusetts. His area of expertise is 18th-century British literature.

Early life and education 
Patye was raised in Corning, New York.

Patye received an A.B. from Hamilton College. He received MA in English from the University of Virginia in 1973. His thesis was Poets and Painters, and Two Versions of Meredith's Love in the Valley. He received an MA in Philosophy in 1977, also from the University of Virginia. His thesis was Intentionalism in Literary Aesthetics. He received a PhD from the University of Virginia in 1979. His dissertation was Concepts of Probability in the Renaissance and the Augustan Age.

Career 
Patey became an assistant professor at Smith College in 1979 and a professor in 1991. In 2003, he became the Sophia Smith Professor of English Language and Literature at Smith College.

In 1994, Patey received a Guggenheim fellowship in English. He has also received fellowships from the National Endowment for the Humanities and the American Council of Learned Societies.

Selected publications

Books 

 Probability and Literary Form: Philosophic Theory and Literary Practice in the Augustan Age. Cambridge: Cambridge University Press, 1984. 
 The Life of Evelyn Waugh: A Critical Biography. Blackwell Critical Biographies 8. Oxford: Blackwell. 1998.

Articles

As editor 

 Patey, D. L., and Keegan, T., eds. Augustan Studies: Essays in Honor of Irvin Ehrenpreis. Newark: University of Delaware Press, 1985. 
 Patey, D. L. "Of Human Bondage: Historical Perspectives on Addiction". Smith College Studies in History vol. 52. (2003) 
 Waugh, Evelyn  Ninety-Two Days. The Complete Works of Evelyn Waugh vol. 22. Douglas Lane Patey, ed. Oxford: Oxford University Press, 2021.

References

1952 births
Living people
Hamilton College (New York) alumni
People from Corning, New York
University of Virginia alumni
American academics of English literature
Smith College faculty
20th-century American non-fiction writers
21st-century American non-fiction writers